John Hinge (born 6 June 1986) is a former professional Australian rules footballer who played for the Adelaide Football Club in the Australian Football League (AFL). He was originally from the Glenelg Football Club in the South Australian National Football League (SANFL).

Hinge played his only AFL game on 5 May 2007 against Collingwood at AAMI Stadium. Named on the bench, he performed solidly in a game where Adelaide was defeated, but limped off the ground after a hamstring injury.

Hinge was delisted from the Crows squad at the end of the 2007 season after playing just one game. He joined Clayton Lamb as just the second player to play only one game for Adelaide.

He is the elder brother of Adelaide Crows AFL football player Mitch Hinge.

References

1986 births
Australian rules footballers from South Australia
Living people
Glenelg Football Club players
Adelaide Football Club players
Sturt Football Club players
People educated at Sacred Heart College, Adelaide